The Roberson Museum and Science Center is located in Binghamton, New York.  The museum's exhibits focus on art, local history, science and natural history.

The centerpiece of the museum is the 1904 Roberson Mansion, which was designed by local architect C. Edward Vosbury. More contemporary additions to the mansion were added in the 1960s and 1980s, which expanded the exhibit space, included a planetarium, added offices, and upgraded the vaults and collections preparation space.

The museum features changing exhibits and a large model train layout that depicts regional landscapes in the 1950s.  The museum hosts annual special events, including decorating the Roberson Mansion for the Christmas holidays, a food and wine festival, Halloween activities, science fiction conventions, a model train and doll fair, and more.

References

External links
 Roberson Museum and Science Center - official site

Museums in Broome County, New York
Buildings and structures in Binghamton, New York
Planetaria in the United States
Tourist attractions in Binghamton, New York